The Senova D60 is a mid-size sedan produced by the Chinese car manufacturer BAIC Motor under the Senova brand.

Overview
The final production version of the Senova D60 debuted in August 2014 on the 2014 Chengdu Auto Show. The Senova D60 is based on the same platform as the second-generation Saab 9-3. Beijing Auto bought the license to the Saab 9-3 models and Saab 9-5 models from GM in 2009. The deal included the Saab-developed 2.0 liter turbo four-cylinder petrol engine and the 2.3 liter turbo four-cylinder petrol engine. At launch, the Senova D60 is only offered with the inline-four 1.8 liter turbocharged petrol engine producing 177hp and 240nm mated to a 5-speed manual gearbox or a 5-speed automatic gearbox, with the Saab-based 2.0 liter turbo engine reserved only for the CC models.
With a planned annual production of 300,000 units, the production of the new model began in September 2014.

Senova CC

A sportier variant of the D60 called the Senova CC was also available. The Beijing Auto Senova CC sedan debuted during the 2014 Guangzhou Auto Show in China, and was launched in China in April 2015. The Senova CC is powered by the inline-four 1.8 liter turbocharged petrol engine producing 177hp and 240nm also offered on the D60 and the Saab-based 2.0 liter turbo engine producing 204hp and 270nm mated to a 5-speed manual gearbox or a 5-speed automatic gearbox. Production for the CC started in 2015 and ended in 2017.

References 

D60
Cars introduced in 2014
Front-wheel-drive vehicles
Sedans
Cars of China